Ebenezer Grant (1882 – 1962) was an English footballer who played five games in the English Football League for Burslem Port Vale in 1906.

Career
Grant played for Tunstall Park before joining Burslem Port Vale as an amateur in January 1906. His debut came in a 5–0 loss to Grimsby Town at Blundell Park on 20 January. He scored his first goal in the English Football League on 24 February, in a 4–1 win over Burton United at the Athletic Ground. However, he played only five Second Division games in the 1905–06 season before being released, probably in 1907.

Career statistics
Source:

References

1882 births
1962 deaths
Sportspeople from Burslem
English footballers
Association football wingers
Port Vale F.C. players
English Football League players